Spaccanapoli may refer to:
 Spaccanapoli (street), a street in Naples, Italy
 Spaccanapoli (band), a band from Naples named after the street